The 2015–16 Minnesota Wild season was the 16th season for the National Hockey League franchise that was established on June 25, 1997.  Head coach Mike Yeo was relieved of his duties on February 13 after the teams thirteenth loss in fourteen games.  He finished with a record of 173–132–44 in his four and a half years as head coach of the Wild. Iowa Wild head coach John Torchetti was promoted to interim head coach. Minnesota was the first team since the 2009–10 Philadelphia Flyers and the 2009–10 Montreal Canadiens to make the playoffs with fewer than 90 points.

Standings

Schedule and results

Pre-season

Regular season

Playoffs

Player statistics
Final stats

Skaters

Goaltenders

†Denotes player spent time with another team before joining the Wild.  Stats reflect time with the Wild only.
‡Traded mid-season

Awards and honours

Awards

Milestones

Transactions
The Wild have been involved in the following transactions during the 2015–16 season.

Trades

Free agents acquired

Free agents lost

Claimed via waivers

Player signings

Draft picks

Below are the Minnesota Wild's selections at the 2015 NHL Entry Draft, to be held on June 26–27, 2015 at the BB&T Center in Sunrise, Florida.

Draft notes

 The Minnesota Wild's third-round pick went to the Arizona Coyotes as the result of a trade on January 14, 2015 that sent Devan Dubnyk to Minnesota in exchange for this pick.
 The Boston Bruins' fifth-round pick went to the Minnesota Wild as the result of a trade on June 27, 2015 that sent a fifth-round pick in 2016 to Boston in exchange for this pick.
 The Minnesota Wild's fifth-round pick went to the Columbus Blue Jackets as the result of a trade on March 2, 2015 that sent Jordan Leopold to Minnesota in exchange for Justin Falk and this pick.
 The Vancouver Canucks' seventh-round pick went to the Minnesota Wild as the result of a trade on June 28, 2014 that sent a third-round pick in 2014 to Tampa Bay in exchange for a third-round pick in 2014 and this pick. Tampa Bay previously acquired this pick as the result of a trade on June 27, 2014 that sent a second-round pick in 2014 to Vancouver in exchange for Jason Garrison, the rights to Jeff Costello and this pick.

References

Minnesota Wild seasons
Minnesota Wild season, 2015-16
Minnesota Wild
Minnesota Wild